Delhi–Alwar Regional Rapid Transit System (Delhi–Alwar RRTS) is a 164 km long under-construction semi-high speed rail corridor connecting Delhi, Gurgaon, Rewari and Alwar. It is one of the three rapid-rail corridors planned under Phase-1 of the Rapid Rail Transport System of the National Capital Region Transport Corporation (NCRTC). With maximum speed of 160 km/h and average speed of 105 km/h, the distance between Delhi and Alwar will be covered in 104 minutes. The project is expected to cost 37,000 crores.

The Phase-I construction is expected to be complete by December 2024.

History 
The National Capital Region Planning Board (NCRPB) as part of its Integrated Transportation Plan 2032 identified eight rail based rapid transit corridors to improve the efficacy of transportation system in the NCR. These were:
 Delhi - Gurgaon - Rewari - Alwar
 Delhi - Ghaziabad - Meerut
 Delhi - Sonipat - Panipat
 Delhi - Faridabad - Ballabhgarh - Palwal
 Delhi - Bahadurgarh - Rohtak
 Delhi - Shahadra - Baraut
 Ghaziabad - Khurja
 Ghaziabad - Hapur
Of these Delhi-Alwar, Delhi-Panipat and Delhi-Meerut are to be constructed in the first phase.  The Urban Mass Transit Company was given the job of conducting a feasibility study on 23 March 2010. The study thus submitted was approved by the Planning Board in 2012. The contract was then transferred to NCRTC on 18 January 2017 to carry the study forward.

On 15 June 2018, the 100 km long first phase of the project from Hazrat Nizamuddin to Shahjahanpur-Neemrana-Behror, at an  estimated cost of 25,000 crore, was approved by the Haryana government.

Construction
Construction of Delhi-Alwar route with total 22 stations in will be completed in the following three construction phases and a pre-construction phase:

 Pre-construction phase - January 2019 to December 2019: Pre-construction activities such as Pile Loading Test and Geo-Technical Survey for one year from January 2019 to December 2019.
 Phase-1 (Delhi to SNB) - January 2020 to December 2024: The 106 km Sarai Kale Khan in Delhi to Gurgaon to SNB (Shahjahanpur-Neemrana-Behror Urban Complex) route, of which 75 km is in Haryana. Initial 35 km with 5 stations will be underground mostly in Delhi and Gurgaon, and subsequent 71 km route with 11 stations will be overground in Haryana. To be completed by 2024. In April 2020, GR Infrastructure emerged as the lowest bidder for package 1: IDPL Complex Ramp - Rajiv Chowk Ramp with 3 stations.
 Phase-2 (SNB to Sotanala) - <dates>?: stations en route include Shahjahanpur, Neemrana and Behror.
 Phase-3 (Sotanala to Alwar) - <dates>?: All in Rajasthan.

Stations 
There will be total 22 stations in total; 16 (11 elevated and 5 underground) will be built in the first phase and the rest in later phases.

Status updates 

 June 2018: Final Detailed Project Report (DPR) of the project is approved by the Government of Haryana.
 December 2018: The Phase-I construction project proposal for Delhi-Gurgaon-Shahjahanpur-Neemrana-Behror stretch is approved by NCRTC.
 February 2019: The Government of Haryana approved the project.
 June 2019: The Government of Rajasthan approved the project.
 November 2019: Bids for the construction of the Gurgaon section of the project were invited.
 September 2020: Construction started on a 10 km stretch in Gurgaon.
 November 2021: Work on the project's key stretch awaits centre's nod.
 May 2022: Pre-construction work begins on the project's corridor in Gurgaon.

See also
 Urban rail transit in India
 Delhi-Sonipat-Panipat Regional Rapid Transit System
 Delhi–Meerut Regional Rapid Transit System
 Railway in Haryana
 Highways in Haryana

References

External links 
 

Proposed railway lines in India
Transport in Delhi
Transport in Haryana
Transport in Rajasthan
National Capital Region (India)
Transport in Alwar